Ralph Levy (December 18, 1920 – October 15, 2001) was an American producer, film and television director.

Biography
Ralph Levy was born in Scranton, Pennsylvania.  He directed episodes of several television shows, including I Love Lucy, Green Acres,  The Beverly Hillbillies, Petticoat Junction, Trapper John, M.D. and Hawaii Five-O. He also served as producer/director of The Ed Wynn Show, The George Burns and Gracie Allen Show and The Jack Benny Program.  Levy's film directorial career includes Do Not Disturb starring Doris Day, and Bedtime Story starring David Niven, Shirley Jones and Marlon Brando.

Levy was the director of General Foods 25th Anniversary Show: A Salute to Rodgers and Hammerstein, a TV special broadcast on March 28, 1954, on all four TV networks in the US at the time.

Levy won the 1960 Emmy Award for Outstanding Directorial Achievement in Comedy for The Jack Benny Program.

Death
Levy died in Santa Fe, New Mexico, exactly fifty years to the day after the premiere of I Love Lucy, the pilot of which he had directed, although it was never shown to the public until decades later.

External links

http://www.lucyfan.com/ralphlevy.html

1920 births
2001 deaths
American television producers
American television directors
American film directors